Barrett Astin (born October 22, 1991) is a former American professional baseball pitcher. He played in Major League Baseball (MLB) for 1 season for the Cincinnati Reds.

Career

Amateur
Astin attended Forrest City High School in Forrest City, Arkansas and played college baseball at the University of Arkansas. In 2011 and 2012, he played collegiate summer baseball with the Wareham Gatemen of the Cape Cod Baseball League.

Milwaukee Brewers
He was drafted by the Milwaukee Brewers in the third round of the 2013 Major League Baseball Draft and signed.

After signing, Astin made his professional debut with the Helena Brewers and spent the whole season there, going 1–1 with a 4.30 ERA in 37.2 innings pitched. In 2014, he played for the Wisconsin Timber Rattlers where he compiled an 8–7 record and 4.96 ERA in 27 games (18 starts).

Cincinnati Reds
On September 10, 2014, the Brewers traded Astin and Kevin Shackelford to the Cincinnati Reds to complete an earlier trade for Jonathan Broxton. In 2015, he pitched with the Daytona Tortugas and Pensacola Blue Wahoos where he pitched to an 8–9 record with a 3.98 ERA and 1.35 WHIP in 30 games (25 starts), and in 2016, he played for Pensacola where he was 9–3 with a 2.26 ERA and a 0.96 WHIP in 37 games (11 starts).

The Reds added Astin to their 40-man roster after the 2016 season. Astin made the Reds' Opening Day roster for the 2017 season and he made his debut on Opening Day. He was optioned back and forth between Cincinnati and Louisville multiple times during April and May. He was optioned to Louisville on May 18 and he spent the remainder of the season there. In eight innings for the Reds he compiled a 6.75 ERA, and in 26 games for Louisville, he was 3–4 with a 6.10 ERA. He was outrighted to AAA on September 18, 2017, and he was released on April 20, 2018.

Kansas City T-Bones
On May 22, 2018, Astin signed with the Kansas City T-Bones of the independent American Association. He was released on March 4, 2019.

References

External links

Living people
1991 births
People from Forrest City, Arkansas
Baseball players from Arkansas
Major League Baseball pitchers
Cincinnati Reds players
Arkansas Razorbacks baseball players
Wareham Gatemen players
Helena Brewers players
Wisconsin Timber Rattlers players
Daytona Tortugas players
Pensacola Blue Wahoos players
Peoria Javelinas players
Louisville Bats players
Kansas City T-Bones players